Serigne Sidi Moukhtar Mbacké (also spelled Serigne Sidy Muqtar Mbacke; Cheikh Sidy Mokhtar Mbacké) (11 July 1924 – 9 January 2018) was a Senegalese religious leader. He served as the Caliph of the Mouride movement, a large Sufi order based in Senegal, from 1 July 2010 until his death on 9 January 2018.

Life
Serigne Sidi Moukhtar Mbacké was the son of Sheikh Mouhamadou Lamine Bara Mbacke (1891-1936), who was the third son of Amadou Bamba.

Mokhtar Mbacké became Caliph on 1 July 2010, following the death of his predecessor, Serigne Mouhamadou Lamine Bara Mbacké. Mbacké was already 85 years old at the time.

Cheikh Sidy Mokhtar Mbacké died on 9 January 2018, at the age of 93. He had been in declining health for several months. He was buried in the village of Gouye Mbind.

References

1924 births
2018 deaths
Mouride caliphs
People from Touba, Senegal
21st-century caliphs